Zulfiqar Ghouri is a Pakistani politician who was a Member of the Provincial Assembly of the Punjab, from May 2013 to May 2018.

Early life and education

He was born on 31 March 1955 in Sialkot.

He received intermediate level education from Government Murray College, Sialkot in 1973.

Political career

He was elected to the Provincial Assembly of the Punjab as a candidate of Pakistan Muslim League (N) on reserved seat for minorities in 2013 Pakistani general election.

References

Living people
Punjab MPAs 2013–2018
Pakistan Muslim League (N) politicians
1955 births